Philip Honywood may refer to:
 Sir Philip Honywood (died 1752) (c. 1677–1752), British Army officer
 Philip Honywood (died 1785) (c. 1710–1785), his nephew, British Army officer and Member of Parliament